Richard Norton (February 9, 1872 – August 2, 1918) was the organizer and head of the American Volunteer Motor Ambulance Corps (also known as the Norton-Harjes Ambulance Corps), which served on the front in France in World War I from 1914 until it was taken over by the American Army in 1917. He was the son of Charles Eliot Norton and Susan Ridley Sedgewick. He was also the director of the Archaeological Institute of America. He was awarded the Croix de Guerre, the Legion of Honour, and the Order of St. Lazarus. His award of the Cross of the Legion of Honor was the highest award given to any foreigner by France during World War I.

Early life
Norton graduated from Browne and Nichols School and went on to graduate from Harvard with the Class of 1892.

References

 

1872 births
1918 deaths
American archaeologists
Buckingham Browne & Nichols School alumni
Harvard University alumni
Recipients of the Legion of Honour
Recipients of the Croix de Guerre (France)
Recipients of the Order of Saint Lazarus
Deaths from meningitis
Burials at Mount Auburn Cemetery